The Orbe is a river of the Rhine basin. It starts in France and flows to Switzerland where it forms the river Thielle at its confluence with the river Talent. Not to be mistaken with the Orbe, which is a tributary of the Arrats.

Geography
The Orbe has its source near Rousses, forms the lac des Rousses before flowing down to lac de Joux in canton of Vaud, Switzerland. It disappears naturally underground for a stretch of 4 km, to reappear in Vallorbe - where a special ecotourism site was created, the Vallorbe Caves (note, to re-edit - http://www.grottesdevallorbe.ch/). Soon after, in Orbe, the river merges with the Talent and takes the name of Thielle. Flowing through  Yverdon-les-Bains, it joins the  lac de Neuchâtel. It flows out of it through the Thielle channel to the Nidau-Büren channel in Nidau, just before the  regulating dam Port established between Port and Brügg that controls the levels of the three lakes of Seeland.

The Orbe and Thielle drain all the waters from the Canton of Vaud to the Rhine, with the exception of the river Venoge, divided by the Mormont, watershed between the former and the Rhone basins.

History
See Jura water correction.

Itinerary
France 
Les Rousses 
Lac des Rousses
Bois-d'Amont Enters Swiss territory
Canton de Vaud 
Le Chenit 
Lac de Joux 
Le Pont 
underground stretch 
Vallorbe 
Les Clées 
Orbe 
Leaves the community's territory in the plain of Orbe

Tributaries
Ruisseau des Epoisats 
La Jougnena 
Le Talent

References

External links

Production électrique
fr, de, it: Dictionnaire historique de la Suisse

Rivers of France
Rivers of Switzerland
Rivers of the canton of Vaud
Rivers of the Jura
Rivers of Bourgogne-Franche-Comté
Rivers of Jura (department)
International rivers of Europe